NGC 6756 is a small open star cluster in the constellation Aquila, close to NGC 6755.

References

External links
 Simbad
 Image NGC 6756
  NGC 6756
 Webda

NGC 6756
6756
Aquila (constellation)